Viddsee is a storyteller platform for short premium content, with over 2 billion views and more than 3,000 strong storytelling community. It has a mission to empower storytellers through its system by providing content to audiences with its studio and multi-platform network. Viddsee connects storytellers with audiences, brands, and partners to produce and market films and series with its system.

Viddsee services the regional Asian market and has offices in Singapore and Indonesia and its headquartered at Blk71, Ayer Rajah Industrial Estate in Singapore.

It has three-main business services - Viddsee Studios, Viddsee Labs and Viddsee Talent Hub (VTH). Nuggets by Viddsee is a subsidiary arm for bite-sized entertainment content.

History
Viddsee was founded by engineer-filmmaker duo Ho Jia Jian and Derek Tan in 2013. It initially focused on distributing short films to online audiences across its web, mobile and application platforms. As the company grows, Viddsee was determined to empower the larger storyteller ecosystem through community building and partnerships with brands and regional and international film festivals.

Viddsee has a partnership with Singapore's Info-Communications Media Development Authority (IMDA) to promote Singaporean short films, with the support of the Singapore Film Commission.

The first short film that went viral on Viddsee was Gift, which gained over 500 million views in 2014.

Viddsee  established regional content partnerships with Discovery Channel and A+E Networks in 2016. Other content and distribution partnerships established during its initial years include Yahoo!, Discovery Networks, Lifetime Asia  and roKKi for inflight streaming on AirAsia.

Viddsee Studios
Viddsee Studios was launched in 2016 as part of Viddsee’s commercialisation venture into original content creation, headed by executive producer Kenny Tan. The award-winning studio focuses on creating and marketing original films and series to digital-native audiences. It supports brands and organisations to amplify key messages to targeted audiences and achieve higher value.

2018
 
Vaseline Singapore collaborated to create a two-part documentary series titled Visible scars, invincible strengths to connect with audiences, by conveying the brand’s strength as a trusted skin-care product since 1870.

Singapore Tourism Board worked alongside as part of its ‘Passion Made Possible’ brand campaign to launch the In Transit music video to attract potential visitors based on their lifestyles, interests and purpose of traveling.

Five other original web series were slated for 2018, through a separate partnership with IMDA.

2019 

Unilever’s UniCornetto ice cream in Indonesia partnered to produce 90 hari memendam rasa, a romantic short film as part of their global campaign tagline-Don’t Try Too Hard. This was Viddsee’s first branded project for an Indonesia-based campaign. It later won the established Citra Pariwara Advertising Festival 2019 for Best Use of Digital Media - Gold, The MMA SMARTIES Award 2019 for Best Mobile Video - Silver and The Drum Digital Advertising Awards APAC 2019 for Best Video Campaign - Gold and Best Use of Data for Creativity - Highly Commended.

Continuing the great collaboration it had with STB for ‘Passion Made Possible’, Viddsee went on to launch five short films for ‘Interwoven’ directed by Singapore filmmakers. Short films are targeted at STB’s ‘Culture Shaper’ Passion Tribe, consisting of travelers who enjoy immersing themselves in the arts. It later became part of the official selection for Sapporo International Short Film Festival & Market 2019 - for International Competition.

Dove Philippines partnered to produce a ‘My Hair, My Say’ short documentary series spotlighting women with unconventional hairstyles who share their journey of overcoming fear of judgment and stereotypes, while defining their own standards of beauty. Community Chest launched ‘Movement’, the second episode of a three-part documentary series “Add A New Story” to encourage more public donations.

2020

NTUC Social Enterprises released the short film Because You Matter, directed by Ng Yang Meng to promote its benefits for the Merdeka and Pioneer Generations.

‘The Family Portrait’, a short film produced for AXA Insurance Singapore captures the financial struggles of a family whose matriarch is possibly going through a cancer relapse. The short film won Excellence in TV/Video Advertising - Bronze for the Marketing Excellence Awards 2020.

SkillsFuture Singapore produced three short films titled Tomorrow Starts Today to promote lifelong learning amongst Singaporeans.

2021

Viddsee and Deloitte Singapore launched two short film series as part of the #fACE Campaign spotlighting strong female roles. Both series – titled Anatomy of an Athlete and Ambition – are part of Viddsee’s yearly original slate. It hopes to inspire and empower the next generation of young girls and women through authentic storytelling. The project won the MARKies Award 2022 for Most Effective Use of Content - Bronze.

Viddsee Originals
Viddsee has always believed in supporting the storyteller network, which led to Viddsee Studios launching Viddsee Originals in 2017 - consisting of original short films, series and documentaries. Viddsee Originals are created by collaborating with storytellers who strive to produce shows that entertain, engage, and shape conventions through unique storytelling. Viddsee Originals garnered over 4 million views across its multi-network platforms in 2018.

2018

Viddsee launched its social documentary series While You Sleep directed by Christine Seow to highlight Singaporeans who work graveyard shifts. Working together with director Eileen Chong, Viddsee completed its social documentary series Confessions exploring thoughts and emotions during tragedy and difficult situations.

The 2018 slate of Viddsee Originals are a short film anthology, three social documentary series, a coming-of-age comedy-drama, a web series about a taxi driver and a dramatic thriller series about cyberbullying. The ten Singaporean filmmakers in this slate of content are Ellie Ngim, Michael Tay, JD Chua, Rifyal Giffari, Sabrina Poon, Christine Seow, Ng Yiqin, Eileen Chong, Jacky Lee and Don Aravind.

2019
 
With the support of IMDA, Viddsee Originals produced 21 new titles in 2019 - including social documentaries, 10-film anthologies as part of Scene City, thrillers, romance and comedies.

MAXstream collaborated with Viddsee to create a romantic comedy series, Unscripted Man. Drive was part of the Official Selection in the established Series Mania 2019 and Short Shorts Film Festival & Asia 2019.

2020
 
Viddsee debuts its third season of Scene City, an anthology of short films capturing the drama of city life. It comprises 10 fictional short films produced by Viddsee Studios in collaboration with 10 Singaporean filmmakers. The short films explore a diverse range of themes, including romance and familial relationships, mental health, migrant culture, and more. Among the slate is Bak Kwa which was part of the official selection for Bengaluru International Short Film Festival.

Final Exam won the Short Shorts Film Festival & Asia for Audience Choice Award - Biogen Award. Soul Food was part of the Official Selection for Series Mania 2020 - International Short Form Competition.

2021

Viddsee launched Outside The Box, a documentary series supported by the DesignSingapore Council (Dsg). Produced alongside Singaporean film director and documentarian Gabriel Victor Lin, the five-part documentary profiles Singaporean businesses and the people pushing the boundaries through Design Thinking.

Viddsee debuts AI Love K-Drama, a five-part comedy series produced alongside Zhao Wei Films, and written by film producer Huang Junxiang and playwright and improv comedian Luke Somasundram.

Another Day In Paradise was part of the Official Selection for Series Mania 2021 - for Short Form Competition. “The Old Man and The Scene” was part of the Official Selection for Shorts Shorts Film Festival & Asia 2021 - for Asia International Competition.

Viddsee For Good
Viddsee For Good is an effort to combine Viddsee’s storyteller community and digital audiences with partners to raise awareness on social issues, youth empowerment, and encourage the sustainable growth of the local filmmaking industry. Viddsee acts as a canvas for multiple stakeholders - including storyteller, corporations, agencies, charities and more to work together to bring better change and practice corporate social responsibility through unique storytelling.

Past projects from Viddsee For Good include - 'Add A New Story', 'My Kosong Plan', 'The Story Behind: Finding Purpose' and '15 Shorts'.

StoriesTogether Originals was born during the COVID-19 pandemic as a regional initiative to bring together Viddsee’s storyteller community, audiences and partners to bring hope through films during tough times. It launched the first of its 12 short films, 4-documentaries, and 6 short-form series. These Singapore-made films and series will also be used to drive audiences to donate to Community Chest, and be featured during Giving Week to further drive donations for fundraising.

Viddsee Labs
Viddsee Labs is an IP Incubator built for storytellers which aims to support the efforts to democratise the creator economy by developing testbedded IPs to long-form or series IPs for entertainment partners, networks and platforms. With over 5,000 potential IPs and its ever-growing storyteller community, Viddsee Labs utilises Viddsee's platform, data analytics, and creative insights to produce remarkable original stories.

Its expansion into IP development further strengthens relationships with different media stakeholders and partners, helping to facilitate the exposure and growth of Asian storytelling beyond the Asia region.

Viddsee has seen success in developing the IP of some notable short films including the adaptation of Viddsee’s Original short film, 'Home Is Where The Heart Is' by Singapore filmmaker Chang Kai Xiang, was adapted into a drama series for Singapore’s Mediacorp broadcast and streaming channels.

'The Lying Theory', was developed into a five-episode drama series together with its original creator Lauren Teo, for broadcast on Viddsee’s web and mobile platforms.

The award-winning dramatic comedy, 'Love Shop', was recreated on Audible into a 23-minute audio drama pilot. The series was recognised as an official selection at the Melbourne WebFest 2020, and won Best Romantic Comedy at the 2019 Asia Web Awards.

Viddsee partnered with MNC Pictures to launch an accelerator program to develop outstanding Intellectual Property (IP) for filmmakers within the Viddsee network. One such initiative to identify the next generation of content creators and storytellers is Etalase Kota, an anthology series that showcases the uniqueness of the people who live in the city and identity of a city. Etalase Kota was initially part of the Juree Indonesia Awards.

Storytelling For Good 
To support the regional storytelling community and effectiveness of storytelling for impact and change, WarnerMedia and Viddsee Labs partnered to launch ‘Storytelling for Good’ where filmmakers can submit their story concepts advocating for social change. Selected ideas and concepts have the chance to be developed through Viddsee Labs for WarnerMedia.

Viddsee Talent Hub
Viddsee Talent Hub is a global creative platform for brands and marketers to  connect and collaborate alongside storytellers and creatives with diverse capabilities and experiences.

With over 3,000 award-winning storytellers within its global network, combined with expertise from production, creative and marketing, Viddsee is able to support brands in developing and amplifying their content.

Juree

Viddsee Juree Awards (‘Juree’) is an annual film festival celebrating the best short films from Singapore, Indonesia and the Philippines. Juree is part of Viddsee’s commitment to grow a network of storytellers, to support local film communities, and to inspire a new generation of storytellers across Asia. For each edition, the top entries are reviewed by a panel of international judges, who will then handpick the winners. During the festival, Viddsee hosts thematic film screenings, and promotes out-of-competition entries and finalists to our audiences.

In 2016, it held its first event in Indonesia followed by The Philippines in 2017 and followed by Singapore. For its 7th edition, Juree Asia Awards 2022 will be announced to allow for participation to the larger Asian storytelling community.

Nuggets by Viddsee
Nuggets by Viddsee presents bite-sized entertainment content on local culture, social issues and trends targeted at youths in Singapore and beyond. It aims to spark conversations on topics that matter most to youths.

From studio-produced videos to self-produced creations from our storyteller and creator network, it bolsters opportunities for Viddsee to experiment with new and emerging types of content.

Accolades
Branded Awards

MARKies Awards 2022
[Silver] Most Effective Use - Government Sector / Non-Profit Marketing
Workforce Singapore: 'The Seekers'

MARKies Awards 2021
[Bronze] Most Creative - Government Sector / Non-Profit Marketing
Gov.sg: 'As One'

Film Festival Nominations & Awards

Series Mania 2022
Official Selection for Short Form Competition: 'Mirage'

Busan International Short Film Festival 2022
S-Dramas from Viddsee Original:
'A Place To Call Home'
'Call Up Fall In'
'Another Day In Paradise'
'Kat Fish'
'A.I. Love K-Drama'

Other Recent Awards

T.O WebFest 2022
Best International Series: 'Maybe Marriage'

ContentAsia Awards 2022
Best Short-form Drama Series: 'Maybe Marriage'

T.O WebFest 2021 
Board of Governor Special Mention Award: 'Siti Vampire'
Best Foreign Language Series: 'The Miracle Barbershop'

ContentAsia Awards 2021
Best Short-form Drama: 'The Miracle Barbershop'

Singapore National Youth Film Awards 2021
Best Screenplay: 'Bulan'
Best Sound Design and Best Live Action: 'Tuition'

Film Festival & Schools Partnerships
Viddsee has content partnerships with a growing list of film festivals, such as the Clermont-Ferrand International Short Film Festival, the Neuchâtel International Fantastic Film Festival, Cinemalaya Philippine Independent Film Festival, Women's Voices Now, Toronto Reel Asian International Film Festival, IFVA festival, China International New Media Short Film Festival, Thai Short Film and Video Festival, Kaohsiung Film Festival (高雄電影節), Golden Harvest Awards, Network for the Promotion of Asian Cinema's Jogja-NETPAC Asian Film Festival, Sedicicorto International Short Film Festival, Guam International Film Festival, Luang Prabang Film Festival, Sapporo International Short Film Festival, Scream Queen Filmfest Tokyo, Youth Film Festival, Singapore Short Film Awards, YXine Film Festival, The KOMAS Freedom Film Festival, Freshwave Film Festival, and the TBS DigiCon6, among others.

It also has partnerships with film schools and film-based organisations.  As of 2017, the following film schools have channels on Viddsee: Griffith Film School, The Puttnam School of Film & Animation at the LASALLE College of the Arts, the Wee Kim Wee School of Communication and Information at Nanyang Technological University, Digital & Film Department at Temasek Polytechnic, the Department of Visual Studies at Kongju National University, Film And TV Faculty at Institut_Kesenian_Jakarta Institut Kesenian Jakarta Fakultas Film dan Televisi ( FFTV ), and the Film and TV Department at Multimedia Nusantara University, among others.

It has channels from the following film-based organisations and groups: Iran: Untold Stories, The Okinawa FIlm Office, Our Better World, The Asian Film Archive, Singapore's National Arts Council, Hong Kong Digital Entertainment Association, and the CILECT Asia-Pacific Association (CAPA).

References

External links
Viddsee
Viddsee BUZZ
Viddsee Community
Viddsee Studios
Viddsee Talent Hub

Singaporean companies established in 2012
Internet properties established in 2012
Singaporean entertainment websites